Ann Southam,  (4 February 1937 – 25 November 2010) was a Canadian electronic and classical music composer and music teacher. She is known for her minimalist, iterative, and lyrical style, for her long-term collaborations with dance choreographers and performers, for her large body of work, and, according to the Globe and Mail, for "blazing a trail for women composers in a notoriously sexist field".

She was born in Winnipeg, Manitoba, in 1937, and lived most of her life in Toronto, Ontario. She died, aged 73, on 25 November 2010.

She was appointed a Member of the Order of Canada in 2010.

Biography
Southam was born in Winnipeg, Manitoba. She is the great-great-granddaughter of newspaper baron William Southam, and benefited from the inherited wealth of the family business. At the age of three, her family moved to Toronto, where Southam lived for the rest of her life.

Southam attended the private Bishop Strachan School for girls in Toronto, and dropped out after a year of Shaw's Business School for secretarial studies. Throughout this time she developed a hobby interest in music. She began composing at age 15 (in 1952) after attending a summer music camp at the Banff School (now known as The Banff Centre).

After dropping out of secretarial school, she studied piano and composition with Samuel Dolin at the Royal Conservatory of Music in Toronto, who introduced her to "tape music". She studied piano with Pierre Souvairan and electronic music with Gustav Ciamaga at the University of Toronto from 1960 to 1963. In 1966, she began teaching electroacoustic composition at the Royal Conservatory of Music.

In 1966, she was introduced to Patricia Beatty, a Canadian choreographer who had just returned from studying modern dance in New York. Shortly afterward, Southam began working on a new score for Beatty's adaptation of Macbeth and the two became friends. With this relationship as the catalyst, she began a collaboration with the New Dance Group of Canada (later known as Toronto Dance Theatre) in 1967, where she became composer-in-residence in 1968. Over her life she composed around 30 pieces for the group, as well as quietly supplying financial donations to keep the group afloat.

In the 1970s, when Southam was in her thirties, she came out as lesbian to her mother.

In 1977, she created Music Inter Alia, a concert promotion organization in Winnipeg that existed until 1991, with Diana McIntosh.

She founded, with Mary Gardiner, the Association of Canadian Women Composers in 1981. She was the first president (1980–'88), life member (2002), and honorary president (2007).

She was also an associate composer of the Canadian Music Centre.

Ann Southam wrote work that was commissioned by organizations including the Canada Council, the Ontario Arts Council, the Music Gallery, and the CBC.

She was diagnosed with lung cancer in 2008, and died, aged 73, on 25 November 2010. Eve Egoyan and Christina Petrowska-Quilico performed at her memorial.

Music 

Southam's early works are lyrical atonal pieces written in a Romantic style, and lyricism remained an important element of her later electronic scores. She also worked with 12-tone techniques.

Southam has been described as having "composed with exacting technique, intent on coaxing warmth out of her machines and bringing electronic music into new spaces".

Southam's passion for electronic music began in the 1960s, and she built a home studio with synthesizers, tape recorders, a mixer and a what she called a "minimum of sound equipment", including Electronic Music Studios synthesizers such as the AKS.

In the 1970s, Southam purchased a house and installed a grand piano, beginning to compose purely acoustic pieces for the first time: first Rivers and then Glass Houses. She asked Christina Petrowska-Quilico to record her performances of the pieces, as a means of preserving them; by 1982, Petrowska-Quilico had begun to perform the pieces live in her tours.

In the 1980s, Southam began developing an interest in music by American minimalists Terry Riley and Steve Reich. Her composition Glass Houses (1981) is constructed from short tonal units that combine and re-combine, creating an overall sense of lyricism.

In the 1990s, Southam largely abandoned the electroacoustic compositional style and began creating instrumental works such as Song of the Varied Thrush (1991) for string quartet; Webster's Spin (1993) for string orchestra, and Full Circles (1996, rev. 2005).

Of her work and interest in incorporating feminism, Southam has said:

I was looking for a way of writing music that would have a feminist aesthetic, because what was thought of as feminist music back in those days was usually vocal music, and it would be the words that would give the feminist meaning. I wanted something where the very workings of the music would reflect a feminist aesthetic.

Southam found that minimalist, iterative compositions reminded her of "women's work" – repetitive, monotonous tasks such as knitting and cleaning that nevertheless sustain life.

Southam's favourite quotes about herself were "staggeringly boring" (from the Montreal Gazette), and "a rather shadowy presence on the new-music scene" (from The Globe And Mail).

Collaborations 
Ann Southam worked for over thirty years with Christina Petrowska-Quilico on Rivers (2005), Pond Life (2008) and Glass Houses, which was revised by Southam in 2009 and by Petrowska-Quilico in 2010. These resulted in 6 CDs. Petrowska-Quilico also toured Rivers with the Toronto Dance Theatre in Toronto at the Premiere Dance Theatre, Harbourfront; in Ottawa at the National Arts Centre; in Halifax; in St. John (New Brunswick) and St. John's, Newfoundland, and in other cities.

Southam was first introduced to Eve Egoyan in 1998, when David Jaeger of the Canadian Electronic Ensemble suggested Egoyan play on a new recording he was producing. Southam worked on several collaborative projects with Eve Egoyan throughout the late '90s and early 2000s including: Qualities of Consonance (1998), Figures (2001), In Retrospect (2004), and Simple Lines of Enquiry (2008).

Awards 
Southam received the Friends of Canadian Music Award in 2002.

In 2010, Southam was named a Member of the Order of Canada, but was too ill to attend the ceremony. The award recognizes her "for her contributions as one of Canada's prominent women composers, known for electronic, acoustic and orchestral works, and as a philanthropist and committed volunteer".

In 2011, Southam was posthumously nominated for a Juno Award for her composition "Glass House #5 from the CD "Glass Houses Revisited" recorded by Christina Petrowska Quilico on Centrediscs".

Legacy 
Ann Southam left $14 million to the Canadian Women's Foundation, creating the Ann Southam Empowerment Fund and investing in the Girls' Fund. This was, at the time, the largest private donation to a Canadian woman's organization.

Southam's published works remain the property of the Canadian Music Centre. The Centre named its recording collection the Ann Southam Digital Audio Archive in her honour.

Her personal archives are held by the Banff Centre Paul D. Fleck Library and Archives.

Southam left five unfinished works that were intended to be performed by Eve Egoyan; Egoyan recorded and released the performances as 5: Music of Ann Southam in 2013. The disc is described as "a continuation of the composer's fascination with very slow, kaleidoscopic transformation of sound using a few very simple chords inside of which a tone row gradually unfolds at the speed of a tulip blossom opening on a warm, sunny spring morning".

Selected compositions

Piano 
 Suite for Piano (1960)
 Four Bagatelles (1961)
 Sea Flea (1962)
 Three in Blue (1965)
 Quodlibet (1967)
 Five Pieces in a Jazz Manner (1970)
 Five Shades of Blue (1970)
 Rivers: Set 1 (1979); Set 2 (1979); Set 3 (1981)
 Cool Blue; Red Hot (1980)
 Four in Hand (1981)
 Glass Houses (15 pieces, 1981)
 Soundings for a New Piano (1986)
 Spatial View of Pond (1986)
 In a Measure of Time (1988)
 Remembering Schubert (1993)
 Where? (1995)
 Qualities of Consonance (1998)
 Two by Two (2000)
 In Retrospect (2004)
 Commotion creek (2007)
 Simple Lines of Enquiry (2007)
 Pond Life (2008)

Chamber 
 Rhapsodic Interlude for Violin Alone (1963)
 Momentum (1967)
 Configurations (1973)
 CounterPlay (1973)
 Integruities (G. Arbour, M. Thompson) (1975)
 Interviews (Arbour, Thompson) (1976)
 Towards Green (1976)
 Waves (1976)
 Networks (1978)
 Re-tuning (1985)
 Quintet, for piano, 2 violins, viola and cello (1986)
 Alternate Currents, Percussion Music for Solo Performer (1987)
 Throughways: Improvising Music (1988)
 Song of the Varied Thrush (1991)
 The Music So Far (1992)
 This Time (1992)
 Webster's Spin, for string orchestra (1993)
 Full Circles (1996 rev. 2005)
 Music for Strings (2000)
 Figures: Music for Piano and String Orchestra (2001)

Electronic 
 A Thread of Sand (1969)
 Boat, River, Moon (1972)
 Sky-Sails (1973)
 L'Assassin Menace (1974)
 Mythic Journey (1974)
 Walls and Passageways(1974)
 The Reprieve (1975)
 Nighthawks (1976)
 Rude Awakening (1976)
 Soundplay (1978)
 Seastill (1979)
 The Story's Dream (1980)
 The Emerging Ground (1983)
 Rewind (1984)
 Music for Slow Dancing (1985)
 Goblin Market (1986)
 Fluke Sound (1989)

Discography 
 Canadian Music for Piano. Louise Bessette piano. 1993. CBC Records MVCD 1064
 Virtuoso Piano Music of Our Own Time. Christina Petrowska piano. 1993. JLH Lasersound JLH 1002 DDD
 Mystic Streams. Christina Petrowska Quilico piano. 1996. Welspringe CD WEL001
 Northern Sirens. Christina Petrowska Quilico piano. 1998. York Fine Arts YFA00999
 Seastill: The Electronic Music of Ann Southam. 1998. Furiant Records FMDC 4604-2
 Fluke Sound. Furiant Records FMDC 4677-2
 Glass Houses: Music of Ann Southam. Eve Egoyan piano, Stephen Clarke piano. 1999. CBC Records MVCD 1124
 Canadian Composer Portraits – Ann Southam. Christina Petrowska Quilico piano, Eitan Cornfield producer/narrator. 2005. Centrediscs CMCCD 10505 (3 CDs)
 Simple Lines of Enquiry. Eve Egoyan piano. 2009. Centrediscs CMCCD 14609
 Pond Life. Christina Petrowska Quilico piano. 2009. Centrediscs CMCCD 14109 (2 CDs)
 Glass Houses Revisited. Christina Petrowska Quilico piano. 2011. Centrediscs CMCCD 16511
 Glass Houses Volume 2. Christina Petrowska Quilico piano. 2014. Centrediscs CMCCD 20114
 Glass Houses Complete. Christina Petrowska Quilico piano. 2015. Centrediscs CMCCD 22215
 Soundspinning. Christina Petrowska Quilico piano. 2018. Centrediscs CMCCD 26018

References

Notes

Further reading
Anderson, C. "Choice and interpretation: Ann Southam in conversation with Carol Anderson". Musicworks, 46 (1990): 4–10.
Báthory-Kitz, Dennis and David Gunn. "If Only I Could Sing: Ann Southam in Conversation with Kalvos and Damian". Musicworks 71 (Summer 1998). Online edition (Accessed 30 December 2007). Also published in "Ann Southam: If Only I Could Sing". eContact! 10.2 – Interviews (1) (July 2008). Montréal: CEC.
Bernstein, Tamara. "Anne Southam", in The New Grove Dictionary of Music and Musicians, edited by S. Sadie and J. Tyrrell. London: Macmillan, 2001.
Egoyan, Eve. "Composition as Enquiry: the explorational music of Ann Southam". Musicworks 101, (2008): 38–45
Everett-Green, Robert. "Ann Southam, a one woman tone poem" Globe and Mail. (9 July 2009, R1)
Lee, R. Andrew. "Anne Southam: Soundings for a New Piano" (1986). Streamed free from Irritable Hedgehog Music.
MacMillan, R. Ann Southam. Don Mills, Ont.: PRO Canada, 1981.
Mason, R. Ann Southam's new music (Throughways). Music Scene 367, (1989): 22. 
Poole, E. "Composer has a tough tone row to hoe". Globe and Mail (15 March 1997).

External links
 Canadian Music Centre
 "Ann Southam" on CBC Music
 Finding Aid for the Ann Southam archives at the Banff Centre

See also 

 Music of Canada
 List of Canadian composers

1937 births
2010 deaths
20th-century classical composers
21st-century classical composers
Canadian classical composers
Members of the Order of Canada
Musicians from Winnipeg
Musicians from Toronto
Women classical composers
20th-century Canadian composers
Canadian women in electronic music
20th-century women composers
21st-century women composers
20th-century Canadian women musicians
Canadian women composers